Magdalena Fjällström (born 12 January 1995) is a Swedish former alpine skier.

Career
Competing at the Junior World Championships in 2011, 2012, 2013 and 2014, her biggest success came at the 2013 edition where she won the gold medal in giant slalom. Competing in four events at the 2012 Winter Youth Olympics, she won the gold medal in the combined. She also won the team event at the 2011 European Youth Olympic Winter Festival.

She made her FIS Alpine Ski World Cup debut in October 2012 in Sölden, being disqualified. She collected her first World Cup points with a 17th place in March 2013 in Lenzerheide. She improved to a 13th place in December 2013 in Lienz, but after collecting 45 World Cup points in 2013–14 she started struggling. Until New Years' 2019, she finished only two World Cup races, and exited or was disqualified in 22 races. Picking up the pace again, she improved to a 10th place in the slalom in February 2020 in Kranjska Gora. She finished 30th in giant slalom at the 2019 World Championships.

She represented the sports club Tärna IK Fjällvinden.

References

External links
 
 

1995 births
Living people
Swedish female alpine skiers
Alpine skiers at the 2012 Winter Youth Olympics
Youth Olympic gold medalists for Sweden
21st-century Swedish women